The 1966 United States Senate election in New Hampshire took place on November 8, 1966. Incumbent Democratic Senator Thomas J. McIntyre won re-election to a full term, having first been elected in a special election in 1962.

Primary elections
Primary elections were held on September 13, 1966.

Democratic primary

Candidates
Thomas J. McIntyre, incumbent United States Senator

Results

Republican primary

Candidates
Harold W. Ayer, former state employee
Doloris Bridges, unsuccessful candidate for Republican nomination for U.S. Senate in 1962 special election
Lane Dwinell, former Governor
William R. Johnson, former chairman of the New Hampshire Republican Party
Wesley Powell, former Governor
Harrison R. Thyng, former United States Air Force Brigadier General

Results

https://en.wikipedia.org/wiki/William_Johnson_(New_Hampshire_judge)#Life_and_career

General election

Results

See also 
 1966 United States Senate elections

References

Bibliography
 
 
 

1966
New Hampshire
United States Senate